The following lists events that happened during 1989 in the Grand Duchy of Luxembourg.

Incumbents

Events

January – March
 5 February – SES' Astra 1A satellite starts broadcasting, beginning SES's dominance of the European satellite communication market.

April – June
 19 April – 150th anniversary of Luxembourg's independence.
 6 May – Representing Luxembourg, Park Cafe finish twentieth in the Eurovision Song Contest 1989 with the song Monsieur.
 13 June – The constitution is amended in numerous ways, affecting electoral eligibility requirements, expanding education access, and requiring counter-signature of Grand Ducal decree.
 18 June – Legislative and European elections are held.  The four established parties all lose ground to three new parties: Action Committee 5/6, GAP, and GLEI.

July – September
 7 July – A law is passed to strengthen the fight against money laundering.
 14 July – Jacques Santer forms a new government, keeping Jacques Poos as his deputy.

October – December
 12 November – The Action Committee 5/6 Pensions for Everyone changes its name to 'Action Committee 5/6'.

Deaths

Footnotes

References